The Man at Midnight (French: Le monsieur de minuit) is a 1931 French comedy film directed by Harry Lachman and starring Jean Weber, Josseline Gaël and Marcel Simon. It was the French-language version of the British film Almost a Honeymoon.

Cast
 Jean Weber as Raoul de Saint=Auban  
 Josseline Gaël as Arlette  
 Marcel Simon as Jean  
 Jules Moy as Isaac Dupont  
 Odette Talazac as Poupette  
 Jean Gobet as Durand-Toucourt  
 Jean Guilton as Le chauffeur 
 Louis Vonelly as Le monsieur 
 Manzoni as Le chanteur  
 Stephen Weber as Le chansonnier  
 Léon Courtois as L'huissier

References

Bibliography 
 Cook, Samantha. Writers and production artists. St James Press, 1993.

External links 
 

1931 films
French comedy films
1931 comedy films
1930s French-language films
Films directed by Harry Lachman
French multilingual films
French black-and-white films
1931 multilingual films
1930s French films